The men's 4×200 metre freestyle relay at the 2007 World Aquatics Championships took place on 30 March 2007 at the Rod Laver Arena in Melbourne, Australia. The top-12 finishers from this race qualified for the event at the 2008 Olympics. 27 teams entered and swam the event.

The existing records when the event started were:
World record (WR): 7:04.66, Australia (Hackett, Klim, Kirby, Thorpe), 27 July 2001 in Fukuoka, Japan.
Championship record (CR): 7:04.66, Australia (Hackett, Klim, Kirby, Thorpe), Fukuoka 2001 (27 July 2001)

Results

Finals

Heats

See also
Swimming at the 2005 World Aquatics Championships – Men's 4 × 200 metre freestyle relay
Swimming at the 2008 Summer Olympics – Men's 4 × 200 metre freestyle relay
Swimming at the 2009 World Aquatics Championships – Men's 4 × 200 metre freestyle relay

References

Men's 4x200m Freestyle Relay Heats results from the 2007 World Championships. Published by OmegaTiming.com (official timer of the '07 Worlds); retrieved 2009-07-11.
Men's 4x200m Freestyle Relay Final results from the 2007 World Championships. Published by OmegaTiming.com (official timer of the '07 Worlds); retrieved 2009-076-11.

Swimming at the 2007 World Aquatics Championships